Altınova is a village in the Evciler District, Afyonkarahisar Province, Turkey. Its population is 541 (2021).

References

Villages in Evciler District